Chloe Kohanski (born December 29, 1993), aka chloe mk, is an American rock singer and singer-songwriter. She is the winner of season 13 of the American talent competition The Voice at the age of 23.

Career

The Voice (2017)

Kohanski auditioned in 2017 to compete in the thirteenth season of The Voice. In the blind auditions, broadcast on October 9, 2017, on NBC, she sang "The Chain" from Fleetwood Mac. Three of the four judges—Miley Cyrus, Jennifer Hudson, and Blake Shelton—turned their chairs with only Adam Levine refraining. She chose to be part of Team Miley. In the knockouts stage, broadcast on October 30, 2017, she was eliminated by Miley Cyrus, who opted to keep Ashland Craft instead. Both Blake Shelton and Jennifer Hudson wanted to steal the eliminated Kohanski, and she chose to continue as part of Team Blake. On December 19, 2017, Kohanski won the season title with "Wish I Didn't Love You". This marked the sixth victory for coach Blake Shelton which added to his record as the mentor with the most wins on the show. Kohanski won the $100,000 grand prize and a record deal with Universal Music Group. She said that she will continue her efforts to bring rock and roll and classic rock into pop culture.

The Voice performances
 – Studio version of performance reached the top 10 on iTunes

Record deal and name change (2018-present)

Following the end of The Voice season 13, Kohanski was signed to Republic Records. On May 22, 2018, she released her debut single "Come This Far". On the season 14 finale, she performed her new single which was her first TV performance after winning the competition.

In 2019, Kohanski changed her stage name to Chloe MK. On May 24, 2019, she released her first single under her new name titled "To Be Young". She later announced that she would be releasing her first extended play titled "Fantasy" which was released on July 19.

On June 16, 2019, Chloe started her tour with Sizzy Rocket. She performed in Chicago, Il, and her further tour dates included Cleveland, OH on June 17, Nashville, TN on June 18, Indianapolis, IN, on June 19, Pittsburgh, PA on June 20, Washington, D.C. on June 21, and New York, NY on June 23.

Discography

Compilation albums

Extended play

Singles

References

1993 births
American women rock singers
American women pop singers
American new wave musicians
American pop rock singers
Living people
People from Mount Juliet, Tennessee
Singers from Tennessee
The Voice (franchise) winners
Universal Music Group artists
21st-century American women singers
21st-century American singers